Olubunmi Tunji-Ojo (born 1 May 1982) is a Nigerian politician, entrepreneur and philanthropist. He is a member of the House of Representatives (Nigeria), representing Akoko North East/Akoko North West Federal Constituency of Ondo State. He is the Chairman of the House Committee on Niger Delta Development Commission (NDDC). He is currently serving his first term in the National Assembly (Nigeria) having been elected in March 2019 on the platform of the All Progressives Congress (APC).

Early life and education
Olubunmi Tunji-Ojo, popularly called BTO was born in Oyin Akoko, Ondo State, Nigeria. He attended Ansarudeen Primary School, Oyin Akoko from 1987 to 1990 and Hakda International school in Kaduna from 1990 to 1992 before completing his primary education at Universal Primary School, Akure in 1993. He then proceeded to FUTA staff secondary school, Akure for his secondary education where he was elected the senior prefect in 1998.

In 1999, he gained admission into Obafemi Awolowo University, Ile-Ife) to study Electrical and Electronics Engineering. In 2002, while in his third year at the Obafemi Awolowo University, he proceeded to the University of North London (now London Metropolitan University) where he studied Electronics and Communication Engineering and graduated in 2005. He obtained a master's degree in Digital Communication and Networking from the same institution in 2006. 
He holds certifications in eighteen professional qualifications in ICT including the prestigious title of being one of the first set of certified ethical hackers from Royal Britannia IT Training Academy in the United Kingdom before he turned 24 years.

Career
Before his advent into politics, Olubunmi Tunji-Ojo was an accomplished business and management executive with a flourishing career in ICT, becoming the CEO of a leading indigenous ICT consultant company in Nigeria, Matrix IT Solutions Limited, at the age of 24. As a professional, he holds a certification in Ethical Hacking and Counter Measures. He is also a certified CompTIA Network Plus Engineer and a Britannia Hardware A+ Management Certificate Holder.

In Nigeria, he consulted for the World Bank and several government agencies, including Petroleum Technology Development Fund (PTDF), Joint Admission and Matriculation Board (JAMB), National Film and Video Censors Board (NFVCB), Nigerian Content Development and Monitoring Board (NCDMB), National Health Insurance Scheme, Abuja (NHIS), Nigeria Sovereign Investment Authority (NSIA), various committees of the Senate and House of Representatives of the Federal Republic of Nigeria, Nigeria Gas Company, National Commission for Mass Literacy, Adult and Non-Formal Education among others.

Politics
In 2019, he was elected into the House of Representatives (Nigeria) to represent Akoko North East/Akoko North West Federal Constituency of Ondo State on the platform of the All Progressives Congress (APC). Upon his inauguration, he mobilized 246 other lawmakers to support the speakership ambition of the Speaker, Rt. Hon. Femi Gbajabiamila, under the forum of first-timers lawmakers, chaired by him. Months later, he was appointed by the Speaker of the House, Rt. Hon. Femi Gbajabiamila as the Chairman of the House Committee on Niger Delta Development Commission (NDDC). He led the House of Representatives Committee to probe alleged malfeasance of over 80 billion Naira in the commission, making it the first time a probe will be launched into the financial activities of the NDDC in its over twenty years of existence. In March 2021, his proposed bill to repeal the NDDC Act which will make abuse of office impossible, a bill that passed the first reading.

Tunji-Ojo is also a member of House of Representatives Committees on National Security and Intelligence, Local Content, Gas Resources, North East Development Commission (NEDC), Housing, FCT Area Council and Ancillary Matters, Solid Minerals and Pilgrims Affairs.

On the 22nd of January, 2021, he was awarded Honorary Doctorate Degree in Public Administration by Joseph Ayo Babalola University (JABU) Ikeji Arakeji, Osun State. He is a recipient of the Sir Ahmadu Bello Platinum Leadership Award of Excellence as well as the Kwame Nkrumah Leadership Award as a Worthy Ambassador of African Youth.

Personal life
Olubunmi Tunji-Ojo is married to Abimbola Tunji-Ojo who also hails from Ondo State and they have two children.

Awards and recognition
 Honorary Doctorate Degree in Public Administration - Joseph Ayo Babalola University 
 Kwame Nkrumah Leadership Award - “Worthy Ambassador of African Youth” by All African Students Union (AASU)                                                                    
 Member, Royal Council for Commerce and Industry, United Kingdom
 Member, E-Commerce Council 
 Member, The Computing Technology Industry Association 
 Member, Information Systems Audit and Control Association
 Member, British Society of Instrumentation and Control, United Kingdom
 Member, Electronic Consultancy Society, United Kingdom
 Member, Digital Communication Network, United Kingdom

References

Living people
1982 births
Alumni of London Metropolitan University
Members of the House of Representatives (Nigeria)